Echthrus is a genus of ichneumon wasps in the family Ichneumonidae.

Species
The following species are recognised in the genus Echthrus:
 Echthrus abdominalis Cresson 1868
 Echthrus adillae Davis, 1895
 Echthrus angustatus Tosquinet 1900
 Echthrus brevicornis Brischke 1865
 Echthrus coracinus Gupta 1978
 Echthrus cryptiformis (Ratzeburg 1848)
 Echthrus longicornis (Ratzeburg 1848)
 Echthrus niger Cresson, 1868
 Echthrus reluctator (Linnaeus 1758)
 Echthrus rufipes Uchida 1929
 Echthrus tuberculatus (Uchida 1929)

References

Further reading

 
 
 

Parasitic wasps